The Salem Marine Society (est. 1766) is a seafarers charity in Salem, Massachusetts. Around 1836, the group acquired the Franklin Building on Washington Square West and Essex Street as their headquarters, which was eventually rebuilt into the Hawthorne Hotel.

References

Further reading
 
 
  
 Salem Marine Society of Salem, Mass.: minutes and events in the celebration of the one hundred and fiftieth anniversary. 1922.

External links
 Official site

1766 establishments in the Thirteen Colonies
1760s establishments in Massachusetts
Salem, Massachusetts